Sainte-Famille-de-l'Île-d'Orléans (Sainte-Famille prior to September 12, 2017) is a municipality in the L'Île-d'Orléans Regional County Municipality, Quebec, Canada, part of the administrative region of Capitale-Nationale. It is situated along the western shores of Island of Orléans.

Founded in 1661, Sainte-Famille-de-l'Île-d'Orléans is the oldest settlement on l'île d'Orléans and has one of the most important concentrations of houses of the old French regime.

History
In 1661, l'Île d'Orléans' first parish was formed and it was known until 1679 as Paroisse de l'Île. The parish municipality was first established in 1845 as La Sainte-Famille, abolished in 1847, and reestablished in 1855. The article 'La' disappeared in the 19th century. A post office named Sainte-Famille-d'Orléans was opened in 1852.

On September 12, 2017, the Parish Municipality of Sainte-Famille changed statutes and name to the Municipality of Sainte-Famille-de-l'Île-d'Orléans.

Demographics

Population

Language

Cultural significance

In literature
 In The Spy Who Loved Me, Ian Fleming's ninth novel in his James Bond series, the narrator Vivienne Michel was born and raised in Sainte-Famille.

See also
 Chenal de l'Île d'Orléans
 Île d'Orléans

References

External links

 Île d'Orléans - Sainte-Famille portrait

Municipalities in Quebec
Incorporated places in Capitale-Nationale
Quebec City Area
1661 establishments in the French colonial empire
L'Île-d'Orléans Regional County Municipality